Canton Academy, officially known as the Canton Academic Foundation, is a segregation academy in Canton, Mississippi, the county seat of Madison County. It serves 285 students in grades K-12.

History

Canton opened in January 1970 as a segregation academy. The school's founders were so concerned about the impact of school desegregation that they accepted white students from families for which they knew could not afford tuition. Canton Academy board president J. D. Weeks said that he "anticipat[ed] the public school system of Canton would be virtually all black". In the school's first year, all but one white high school seniors withdrew from Canton Rogers High School and enrolled in Canton Academy.

Canton Academy was initially housed in an abandoned tent factory. The curriculum was reported to be similar to public schools, but with an extra focus on the "evils of communism".

In the case Coffey v. State Educational Finance Commission (1969), the United States District Court for the Southern District of Mississippi found that "No Negro pupils would be admitted to the private school."

Sports
Canton competes in shooting sports against Jackson Preparatory School and Tri-County Academy.  The school sponsors a Twenty Guns in Twenty Days raffle to support athletics.

Notable people
Glenn Boyce, chancellor of the University of Mississippi coached football at Canton Academy. In 2019, Boyce was criticized his past affiliation with segregation academies like Canton Academy.

References

 Bolton, Charles C. The Hardest Deal of All: The Battle Over School Integration in Mississippi, 1870-1980. University Press of Mississippi, 2005. , 9781604730609.
 Cobb, James Charles. The Most Southern Place on Earth: The Mississippi Delta and the Roots of Regional Identity. Oxford University Press, 1994. , 9780195089134.

Private high schools in Mississippi
Private middle schools in Mississippi
Private elementary schools in Mississippi
Schools in Madison County, Mississippi
Segregation academies in Mississippi